W. Allan Percival (1923 – c. 1985) was a Canadian cricketer.  He was a right-handed batsman who fielded as a wicket-keeper.  As with his exact date of birth being unknown, it is also unknown where in Canada he was born.

Percival made his first-class debut for Canada in 1951 at the Toronto Cricket, Skating and Curling Club against the touring Marylebone Cricket Club.  Later, in 1954 he played four first-class matches against English county opponents during Canada's tour of England.  This included his final first-class appearance, which came against Yorkshire at North Marine Road Ground, Scarborough during Canada's 1954 tour of England.  In his five career first-class matches, he scored 61 runs at a batting average of 8.71, with a high score of 23.  Behind the stumps he took 9 catches and made a single stumping.  In Canada, he played numerous non-notable matches, including ones for Ontario between 1948 and 1952.

He died in Toronto, Ontario c. 1985.

References

External links
Allan Percival at ESPNcricinfo
Allan Percival at CricketArchive

1923 births
1985 deaths
Canadian cricketers
Cricketers from Ontario
Wicket-keepers